Ethan Nicolle is an American comic book creator, artist, and writer. He created the Slave Labor Graphics comic Chumble Spuzz which has been released as two graphic novels so far. He also worked with his younger brother, Malachai, to create Axe Cop.  From 2019 to 2021, Nicolle was the creative director for The Babylon Bee, a news satire website. As of 2022, Ethan works as a scripted creator for The Daily Wire.

Biography

Nicolle was honored as the special guest Alternative Press Expo in San Francisco on November 1, 2008.

Bibliography
Comics work includes:
 Bearmageddon (web comic) (2011)
 Axe Cop: Vol. 2 Bad Guy Earth (2011)
 Axe Cop: Volume 1 (2011)
 Jesus Christ: In the Name of the Gun (2008) 
 Eef's Sketch Book (2008)
 Sumo Poop: A Collection of Horrible Cartoons (2008)
 Chumble Spuzz: Kill the Devil (2008)
 Chumble Spuzz Volume 2: Pigeon Man and Death Sings the Blues (2008)
 Lunaractive: Code of the Juggernaut (an abandoned project that has only been displayed as a part of Ethan Nicolle's official Blog) (2007)
 Puppet Terrors (with Jesse Wroblewski)  (2005)
 The Weevil (2006)
 Creep (2003) (written by Brinton Williams) (Conspiracy Productions)
 Eef: A Cartoon Collection (2003)
 Check Your Shoes: A Cartoon Collection (2001)
 The Cloacal Collection: A Cartoon Collection (2000)
 The Hall #2 (1997)
 The Hall #1 (1997)
 Various issues of The Barker (1995–98)
 The Drug Busters (1991)

Awards and honors
 Special Guest honor at the 2008 Alternative Press Expo
 Best Humor Publication nomination 2009 Eisner Awards
 Artist of the Week of Pixelated Geek for February 10, 2010 for his work on Axe Cop.
 Special Guest at San Diego Comic Con in 2011 .
 Favorite Web-based Comic award 2011 Eagle Awards for his work on Axe Cop.
 Web Comic of the Year award 2011 Shel Dorf Awards for Axe Cop''.
 Top Ten Graphic Novels for Teens 2012 YALSA list YALSA Top 10 Graphic Novels 2012.

References

External links
 
 Ethan Nicolle's blog
 
 Lunaractive
 Where Monsters Dwell Interview 
 Bearmageddon

American illustrators
Living people
American comics writers
People from North Bend, Oregon
Year of birth missing (living people)
American Christians